Andrew Holdsworth, (born 29 January 1984) is an English retired professional footballer who last played for Guiseley. He has previously played for Huddersfield Town, Oldham Athletic and Morecambe. He is currently the Professional Development Phase manager at Sheffield Wednesday

Playing career

Huddersfield Town
A product of the Huddersfield Town academy, Holdsworth made his professional debut in the 2003–04 season aged 19. He was a substitute in the 2–1 victory over Bristol Rovers at the Galpharm Stadium and quickly went on to establish himself in the first team. During the season, playing at right-back, he made 39 league appearances (five as a substitute).

He scored his first professional goal against Sunderland at the Stadium of Light in a League Cup tie which Huddersfield won 4–2, a goal which was aided by referee Mark Cooper's decision to play-on following a handball by Ben Clark.

In late 2006, he was named on Alisdair Straughan's list of Huddersfield Town's Fans' Favourites, one of 6 members of the then current squad to be named.

In April 2007, Holdsworth signed an extension to his contract, which would see him stay at the Galpharm until 2009. After a move from full back into midfield, he scored his first two goals of the season in the final league match of 2006–07 at home to Leyton Orient where Huddersfield won 3–1.

On 26 April 2008, Holdsworth was named Town's Player of the Year, with 40% of the votes. Second was goalkeeper Matt Glennon and third was Andy Booth.

Oldham Athletic
On 26 May 2009, after failing to agree a new contract, he left Huddersfield Town. After playing 2 friendlies for Bradford City, he was offered a two-year deal at Oldham Athletic, which he accepted. He played fifteen games for the club before being released on 28 January 2011.

Morecambe
In January 2011, Holdsworth signed with Morecambe until the end of the season, and made his debut against Accrington Stanley on 1 February 2011. He was released at the end of the season.

Alfreton Town
On 31 August 2011, Holdsworth joined Alfreton Town of the Conference National. He took the number 23 shirt.

Guiseley
In October 2011, after four appearances for Alfreton, he joined Guiseley. He made his debut against Workington A.F.C., helping Guiseley to a 3–0 win thanks to goals from Danny Forrest, Ciaron Toner and striker Gavin Allot. He now plays right-back after the absence of Jamie Clarke. In the season of 2014–15 with the introduction of right-back Ryan Toulson, Mark Bower moved Holdsworth back into midfield where he is a great threat in front of goal. He was named club captain for the season, leading Guiseley to promotion to National league. Soon after Guiseley released Holdsworth.

International career
In January 2006, Holdsworth was selected in the squad to represent the Football League u-21 side in a match against the Italian football league u-21s.

Coaching career
Andy retired from football in 2015 to take up a full time coaching position at Barnsley Fc. 
Andy would then take up a new role, joining Sheffield Wednesday as the clubs Professional Development Phase manager in September 2018. Due to the COVID-19 pandemic, he would get his first taste of first team management, taking charge of the FA Cup game away to Exeter City.

Honours

Club

Huddersfield Town

Division Three Play-off Winners: 2003–2004

Personal

Club awards
Huddersfield Town Player of the Year Awards – 2007–08: Fans' Player of the Year

References

External links
Andy Holdsworth player profile at htafc.com

Living people
1984 births
English footballers
Sportspeople from Pontefract
Huddersfield Town A.F.C. players
Oldham Athletic A.F.C. players
Morecambe F.C. players
English Football League players
Association football fullbacks
Association football midfielders
Association football utility players
Alfreton Town F.C. players
Guiseley A.F.C. players
Barnsley F.C. non-playing staff